First Lady of Mongolia refers to the wife of the president of Mongolia.

Spouses of Leaders of the Mongolian People's Republic (1923-1990)

First ladies of Mongolia (since 1990)

References

Mongolia
Mongolian politicians